Andricus quercuscalicis is a gall wasp species inducing knopper galls.

Knopper galls develop as a chemically induced distortion of growing acorns on pedunculate oak (Quercus robur L.) trees, caused by gall wasps, which lay eggs in buds with their ovipositor. The gall thus produced can greatly reduce the fecundity of the oak host, making this gall potentially more of a threat to the reproductive ability of the tree than those that develop on leaves, buds, stems, etc. The Turkey oak (Quercus cerris L.), introduced into Britain in 1735, is required for the completion of the life cycle of the gall. The knopper is a recent introduction to the British Isles, first arriving in the 1960s and now found throughout England, Wales and as far north as Scotland; first occurring for example in 2007 at Eglinton Country Park in North Ayrshire.

The physical appearance of the gall

The large 2 cm gall growth appears as a mass of green to yellowish-green, ridged, and at first sticky plant tissue on the bud of the oak, that breaks out as the gall between the cup and the acorn. If only a few grubs are developing within, then it may appear only as a group of bland folds. Where several grubs are competing for space the shape may become much more contorted, with several tightly bunched galls.

The word knopper derives from the German word 'Knoppe', meaning a kind of felt cap or helmet worn during the 17th century; also a small rounded protuberance, often decorative, such as a stud, a tassel or a knob.

Although normally distinctive the knopper gall can, under some growth conditions, be mistaken for the acorn cup gall, caused by the gall wasp Andricus grossulariae.

Inquilines and parasitoids 
A number of insect inquilines live harmlessly within the knopper gall and some of these, as well as A. quercuscalicis itself, are parasitised by insects referred to as parasitoids.

Life-cycle and arrival in Britain 

Andricus quercuscalicis (Burgsdorf, 1783) (Hymenoptera: Cynipidae) is a small gall wasp with an obligate two-phase life-cycle that requires both pedunculate oak (Q. robur L.) (or occasionally sessile oak Q.petraea L.) and Turkey oak (Quercus cerris L.). Therefore, as with most oak gall wasps, this species has alternate sexual and parthenogenetic (all female) generations. The sexual generation develops in spring in small conical galls that form on the male catkins of the Turkey oak.

Woodway House gardens in Devon have both the required host species and indeed Woodway House was one of the first places in Devon to record and send off for research purposes specimens of both life-cycle stages of this invasive species. Long known in western and northern Europe, having spread from southern and eastern Europe over the last 400 years, A. quercuscalicis came from the continent to Devon via the Channel Islands, the first recorded sightings being in Devon in the 1950s. A. quercuscalicis appears to have arrived naturally from the continent, probably crossing the English Channel on high altitude wind currents.

In 1979, A. quercuscalicis underwent a population explosion in England and for a time there was concern that it would seriously affect acorn fertility and thus the future of England's most iconic tree. This has not been the case, and control is regarded as unnecessary. Knopper galls were first noted at Canonbie in southern Scotland in 1995 and their distribution is often restricted to old country and urban estates where the Turkey oak has been previously planted.

The abnormal acorns develop during summer and the acorn is either wholly or partially replaced by the gall growth. The knoppers become woody and brown in early autumn, after which they fall from the tree and the adult sexual female gall wasp emerges through a vent in the top of the gall in spring. The level of attack by the insect varies greatly from year to year.

See also 

 Gall
 Oak apple
 Oak marble gall
 Oak artichoke gall
 Pineapple gall
 Rose bedeguar gall
 Cola-nut gall
 Red-pea gall
 Alder tongue gall
 Eriophyes tiliae

References

Notes

Sources 
 Redfern, Margaret & Shirley, Peter (2002). British Plant Galls. Identification of galls on plants & fungi. AIDGAP. Shrewsbury : Field Studies Council. .

External links 

 British Plant Gall Society
 
 
The UK Safari site on Knopper galls.
A photograph of a longitudinal section of the gall.
 Video footage of Scottish Galls

Cynipidae
Gall-inducing insects
Hymenoptera of Europe
Insects described in 1783
Oak galls